Heather D. Maynard is the Dr Myung Ki Hong Professor in Polymer Science at the University of California, Los Angeles. She works on protein-polymer conjugates and polymeric drugs. Maynard is a Fellow of the Royal Society of Chemistry and the American Association for the Advancement of Science.

Early life and education 
Maynard became interested in chemistry during junior high. She decided she wanted to become a Professor of Chemistry at the age of 12. She studied chemistry at the University of North Carolina at Chapel Hill. She earned her bachelor's degree with honours at the University of North Carolina at Chapel Hill. She moved to the University of California, Santa Barbara for her Master's studies in materials science. After earning her master's degree in 1995 Maynard joined the California Institute of Technology, where she worked in the research group of Robert H. Grubbs. She moved to ETH Zurich as an American Chemical Society Fellow with Jeffrey Hubbell.

Research and career 
In 2002 Maynard joined the faculty at the University of California, Los Angeles (UCLA). She started her career at the UCLA as the first Howard Reiss Career Development Chair. In 2005 she took part in a National Academy of Engineering Frontiers of Engineering symposium that shared technical research between the United States and Japan. She was promoted to Full Professor at UCLA in 2012. Her research considers polymer materials, including arrays, films for patterning, bioactive proteins and new ways to develop protein-polymer conjugates. These conjugates are used in medical therapeutics to treat a range of diseases, and are synthesised by polymerising from proteins and amino acid-reactive initiators. Maynard has considered the mechanisms that underpin the function of known therapeutics. This includes the development of new synthetic pathways, such as controlled radical polymerization and click chemistry, to make polymers with narrow molecular weight distributions and anchoring sites for particular surfaces. Using controlled radical polymerization. Maynard has shown it is possible to use the fluorous content of poly(ethylene glycol methyl ether methacrylate), fluorous methacrylate and ketene acetal 5,6-benzo-2-methylene-1,3-dioxepane co-polymers to determine whether self assembly results into single or multi-chain nanoparticles. The fluorous content controls the degradation of nanoparticles; high fluorous content results in smaller degradation rate constants.

Maynard integrates polymeric materials with biologically derived molecules. She has designed nanogels and polymers to stabilise biomolecules to temperature variations and agitation. She has also investigated trehalose glycopolymers that contain pendant pyridyl disulfide groups. If polymers only contain side-chain trehalose, they can stabilise a granulocyte colony-stimulating factor and degrade via hydrolysis. If they containpyridyl disulfide groups they can be cross-linked into nanoparticles using peptide glucagon, made bioactive in vitro, neutral to pH and protected from making aggregates. She developed a range of polyethylene glycol nanoparticles that can be cross-linked using hydrazone and oximes. The choice of crosslinking agent determines the degradation of the hydrogels and nanoparticles. These systems can be modified to incorporate chemicals for agricultural applications that require controlled delivery.

In 2016 she was selected as a Fulbright Foundation New Zealand scholar, where she worked on biohybrid polymer materials at the University of Auckland.

Awards and honours 
Her awards and honours include;

 2006 Alfred P. Sloan Foundation Fellow 
 2007 Selected as an Outstanding Emerging Investigator by the Journal of Materials Chemistry A
 2007 Hanson-Dow Award for Excellence in Teaching 
 2008 University of Kansas Walter F. Enz Lecturer 
 2008 American Chemical Society New Orleans Young Academic Investigators Symposium Lecturer 
 2011 Fellow of the Royal Society of Chemistry 
 2017 Fellow of the American Chemical Society Division of Polymeric Materials: Science and Engineering
 2018 Fellow of the American Association for the Advancement of Science
 2019 American Chemical Society Bioconjugate Chemistry Lectureship Award

Selected publications 
Her publications include;

She is an editor of the journals Chemical Science, Polymer Chemistry and Bioconjugate Chemistry.

References 

Living people
American women chemists
Academic staff of ETH Zurich
University of North Carolina at Chapel Hill alumni
Fellows of the American Chemical Society
Fellows of the American Association for the Advancement of Science
Year of birth missing (living people)
University of California, Santa Barbara alumni
California Institute of Technology alumni
University of California, Los Angeles faculty
Fellows of the Royal Society of Chemistry
21st-century American chemists
21st-century American women scientists
American women academics
20th-century American chemists
20th-century American women scientists
21st-century American academics